Advent is an unincorporated community in southeastern Jackson County, West Virginia, United States.  It lies along Advent Road southeast of the city of Ripley, the county seat of Jackson County, and near Jackson County's borders with Kanawha and Roane counties.  Its elevation is 791 feet (241 m).  Advent had a post office, which closed on December 25, 2010.

The community took its name from the local Advent Christian Church.

References

Unincorporated communities in Jackson County, West Virginia
Unincorporated communities in West Virginia